Needmore is an unincorporated community in Hardy County, West Virginia, United States. Needmore lies along West Virginia Route 55 to the west of Baker.

The community most likely received its name because it needed more of everything.

References 

Unincorporated communities in Hardy County, West Virginia
Unincorporated communities in West Virginia